"Mistress Mabel" is a song by The Fratellis and the first single from their second album Here We Stand. The single was released on 26 May 2008. The song was first introduced by the band at their Queen Margaret Union show on 22 February 2008 as the first song on the set list. The first ever radio play was on 3 April 2008 by the radio DJ Jim Gellatly on his X-posure show on XFM Scotland, the same DJ who was the first to give The Fratellis radio play. Zane Lowe played the track to open his show on BBC Radio 1 on 7 April.

The radio edit was released on iTunes (US) on Tuesday 22 May 2008, without any of the B-sides available.

The B-sides include two songs previously released as demos, "Boy Done Good" and "Ella's in the Band", and the previously unheard track "When All the Lights Go Out".

The single received mixed reviews from critics and fans, making a rather disappointing return for The Fratellis as a lead single. It entered the UK Singles Chart at #27 on downloads alone on the day before its physical release, the band's fifth UK Top 40 single. It peaked at #23 the following week before slipping down to #38 during its third week.

Track listing

This is listed on the iTunes Store as Mistress Mabel - EP.

2008 singles
The Fratellis songs
Songs written by Jon Fratelli
2008 songs
Island Records singles